Francis Clement Newton (January 3, 1874 – August 3, 1946) was an American golfer who competed in the 1904 Summer Olympics. In 1904 he was part of the American team which won the silver medal. Newton was the best player for his team together with his teammate Henry Potter he placed sixth in this competition. In the individual competition he won the bronze medal after losing in the semi-finals.

References

External links
 Profile

American male golfers
Amateur golfers
Golfers at the 1904 Summer Olympics
Olympic silver medalists for the United States in golf
Olympic bronze medalists for the United States in golf
Medalists at the 1904 Summer Olympics
1874 births
1946 deaths